A la carte is a board game published in 1989 by Moskito Spiele.

Contents
A la carte is a game in which each player is trying to be a successful chef.

Reception
Brian Walker reviewed A la carte for Games International magazine, and gave it 4 stars out of 5, and stated that "The only real requirement for enjoying this game is a sense of humour."

A la carte came in 2nd place for the 1990 Deutscher Spiele Preis.

References

Board games introduced in 1989

de:A la carte (Spiel)